Wali Ahmed is a Bangladesh Awami League politician and the former Member of Parliament of Comilla-10.

Career
Ahmed was elected to parliament from Comilla-10 as a Bangladesh Awami League candidate in 1973.

Death
On 22 October 1994.

References

Awami League politicians
1994 deaths
1st Jatiya Sangsad members